Jordan Malone (born April 20, 1984) is an American short track speed skater who was a member of the US Olympic Team for the 2010 Winter Olympics in Vancouver, British Columbia. He is from Denton, Texas, and is an alumnus of the Texas Tech University Independent School District. Jordan competed in the 2014 Olympic Games in Sochi, Russia. During one of the Olympic days, Malone got stuck in a bathroom and, later that same day, got stuck in an elevator.

Personal life
Jordan is a -year-old native of Denton, Texas and the only child of single mom, Peggy Aitken. He's lived in Nante, France; Oldebroek, the Netherlands; Long Beach, California; Colorado Springs, Colorado, and Salt Lake City, Utah. His unusual life has taken him around the world to over 154 different cities in 18 different countries on 4 different continents. In 2013 Jordan eloped with his fiancé Angela Kim in a beautiful chapel in Las Vegas. 

Though he put his education on hold, Jordan plans to go to college and get an engineering degree. He is currently studying mechanical engineering at MIT. Jordan enjoys building and has started a business called Full Composite Racing. Jordan makes the "tips" that skaters wear on their fingers for when they put their left hands on the ice on turns. Jordan wasn't happy with the tips the skaters were using, which broke a lot and often didn't stay on. So he experimented with carbon fiber, a super strong material that is also difficult to work with. Jordan Malone now supplies much of the national team, at cost, and sells tips to other skaters to make his money back on the initial investment.

In a quote from his Official Webpage Jordan says: "I spend my free time like most people my age. I go to movies, hang with my friends, have a few hobbies, and just like being lazy sometimes. I also take my puppy Oly (short for Olympic) to the dog park almost every night. He's a one-year-old West Highland Terrier, and a breath of fresh air several times a day. (Oly accompanied Jordan to the 2010 Vancouver Olympics.) Also on my off days, I try to get in a few hours of paintball, another sport I've dabbled in since I was 13. It's always a great way to get rid of some stress before Monday begins." Just recently Jordan also became a certified Scuba Diver.
Jordan is currently studying Mechanical Engineering at Massachusetts Institute of Technology.

Inline speed skating
Jordan began inline speed skating in 1990 at the age of 5, and participated in his first international race in 1995. He made his first World Team in 2000, and turned professional the following year. In 2001, he earned the title of most decorated junior of all time, and in 2003 he was the fastest man in the world, winning the Senior World Championships.

Jordan left the sport of Inline with a total of 8 Junior and 6 Senior World Championship titles. He also competed on the Rollerblade, Inc. and Mogema WIC (World Inline Cup) Professional teams from 2001–2004.

Jordan credits his mother with enabling him to succeed in sports. Although she was not an athlete herself, Jordan says she taught him the life lessons he needed, including attention to detail. She also spent years driving Jordan to practices and meets, including a two-hour trip to Waco, Texas every weekend. She even had a hand in his training: Jordan said she had a moped, which she used to pace him while he skated behind her on inlines.

Injuries (Inline Speed Skating)
In 2002, as an inline skater, Jordan was twice sidelined by significant injuries. First, while warming up at a meet, Jordan slipped and his left foot hit the boards and twisted, resulting in a spiral fracture. Jordan spent four months in a walking cast, during which he could only train by riding a bike or running in water.

Two weeks after returning, another freak accident left him hospitalized: Jordan tripped over a timing wire during a race, and went headfirst into the timing device that had no padding. When Jordan woke up in a hospital in Switzerland, they told him he broke his upper jaw, lost four teeth, and had been convulsing during the 20 minutes it took to stabilize him at the scene. Jordan ended up with four plates and 16 screws in his head to keep his jaw in place.

Jordan momentarily considered quitting at that point. "And then, 'What am I thinking?' No way am I done," Jordan said. "This is what I love to do."

Short Track Speed Skating

Since his birth into the sport of Short Track Speed skating in 2004, Jordan has been the only skater to compete in all of the past 5 World Championships (2005–2009) for the US, making 2009 his 10th consecutive US World Championship including both Inline and Ice. He is the first skater (still the only male) to ever qualify for both Inline and Short Track World Teams, and he did so in consecutive years. In the past 5 years, he's achieved numerous World titles, including 6 World Championship medals (2009 Men's Relay GOLD). In 2007 he earned 7th overall at the ISU World Championships, and in 2008 was ranked 5th in the 1500m, and 6th in the 1000m ISU World Cup Overall classification.

Career highlights
2005 World Cup 6: Gold – Men's Relay

2005 World Championships: Bronze – Men's Relay

2006 World Championship: Bronze – Men's Relay

2006-07 World Cup Series: Bronze – Men's Relay (WC3); 1000m Silver (WC4); Gold – 1000m (WC5); Gold – 1500m (WC5); Bronze – 1000m (WC6)

2007 World Championships: 1500m – 4th overall; 500m – 5th overall; 3000m – 8th overall; Bronze – Men's Relay

2007-08 World Cup Series: Bronze – 1000m (WC4); Bronze – 1500m (WC4)

2008 World Team Championship: Gold

2008-09 World Cup Series: Silver – 1000m (WC5)

2009 World Championships: Gold – Men's Relay

2009 World Team Championships – Bronze

References

External links
ordan Malone at ISU
 
 
 
 Jordan Malone on Facebook
 Jordan Malone's Fan Page on Facebook
 Jordan Malone on UStream
 Jordan Malone on Formspring

1984 births
Living people
American male short track speed skaters
Olympic speed skaters of the United States
Olympic silver medalists for the United States in short track speed skating
Olympic bronze medalists for the United States in short track speed skating
Short track speed skaters at the 2010 Winter Olympics
Short track speed skaters at the 2014 Winter Olympics
Medalists at the 2010 Winter Olympics
Medalists at the 2014 Winter Olympics
Sportspeople from Denton, Texas